PiaGrace Moon (born 26 June 1993) is an Australian actress and model, best known for her role as Jasmine in Winners & Losers.

Early life
Moon was born on 26 June 1993 in Townsville, Queensland. She lived on Magnetic Island and competed in the Magnetic Idol singing competition in 2005 where she was the youngest contestant. Moon was awarded an encouragement award. Moon studied acting at The Australian Film and Television Academy.

Career
Moon has appeared in two short films; Red and Behind the Register. She successfully auditioned for the role of Jasmine Patterson in Winners & Losers in 2011. Moon filmed three episodes and made her screen debut as Jasmine on 5 July 2011.and returned for the next 3 seasons. Moon also filmed a guest appearance as Vanessa Childs in the soap opera Neighbours. 2015 FF "Holding the Man," role of Prue..2015..FF and in The Legend of Ben Hall in role of Peggy Monks, sweetheart of the bushranger "John Dunn"(ref IMdb)

Filmography

References

External links

PiaGrace Moon at StarNow

Living people
Actresses from Queensland
People from Townsville
21st-century Australian actresses
1993 births
Australian film actresses